Blepharida is a genus of leaf beetles of the subfamily Galerucinae. They have co-evolved with plants in the genus Bursera, which they feed on. The plants have developed a sticky, poisonous resin that sprays out when the leaves are bitten into, and the beetles have evolved to cut through the veins of the leaves to disable this mechanism first. There are currently 73 known species in Blepharida, which are found in the Nearctic, Neotropical, Afrotropical and southern Palearctic realms.

Structure 
The exact structure of the genus is contentious, and remains unresolved. In 1940, Heikertinger and Csiki considered Blepharida to include three subgenera, Blepharida sensu stricto, Blepharidella, and Calotheca. In 1968, Bechyné elevated both to the status of genera, and erected a new genus Blepharidina to contain Afrotropical species of Blepharida. In 1982, Seeno and Wilcox returned to the three subgenera described by Heikertinger and Csiki, but retained Blepharidina; despite this, in 1983, Scherer placed many Afrotropical species in Blepharida. In 1992, Furth reclassified Blepharidina as a subgenus of Blepharida. Cladistic analysis in 2004 indicated that Blepharida species from the New World are a single clade, and Afrotropical species are a separate but related clade.

Blepharida and its related genera have been referred to as the Blepharida-group. In 1998, Furth considered it to have sixteen genera, and in 1999 Medvedev added three more for a total of nineteen.

Selected species 

 Blepharida alternata
 Blepharida atripennis 
 Blepharida balyi
 Blepharida bryanti
 Blepharida condrasi
 Blepharida conspersa
 Blepharida flavocostata
 Blepharida florhi
 Blepharida gabrielae
 Blepharida hinchahuevosi
 Blepharida humeralis
 Blepharida irrorata
 Blepharida johngi
 Blepharida judithae
 Blepharida lineata
 Blepharida maculicollis
 Blepharida marginalis
 Blepharida melanoptera
 Blepharida multimaculata
 Blepharida natalensis
 Blepharida nigromaculata
 Blepharida nigrotesselata
 Blepharida pallida
 Blepharida parallela
 Blepharida rhois
 Blepharida sacra
 Blepharida schlechtendalii
 Blepharida singularis
 Blepharida sonorstriata
 Blepharida sparsa
 Blepharida unami
 Blepharida variegatus
 Blepharida verdea
 Blepharida vittata
 Blepharida xochipala

References 

Alticini
Chrysomelidae genera
Taxa named by Louis Alexandre Auguste Chevrolat
Beetles described in 1836